The Portneuf Wildlife Reserve is located in the province of Quebec (Canada), in the western part of the Capitale-Nationale region. This wildlife reserve is administered by SEPAC.

See also
 Island of the Cross (Quebec)
 Jeannotte River
 Batiscan River
 Batiscanie
 Municipality of Rivière-à-Pierre
 Zec Tawachiche

References

External links
 SEPAQ Official Site

Protected areas of Capitale-Nationale
Wildlife sanctuaries of Canada
Protected areas established in 1968
Portneuf Regional County Municipality